Tianzi Wharf (traditionally Gov. Wharf), also known as 'The First Wharf of Canton', is the oldest wharf on the Pearl River in Guangzhou, China. The wharf is at the intersection of Beijing Road and Yanjiang Road Middle. It's currently a wharf of the Guangzhou Water Bus, and serves the ferries between Fangzhi Wharf and several water bus routes. It's also a terminal wharf of Pearl River Night Cruise.

History 

During the years of Qing Emperor Yongzheng (1723-1735), Tianzi Wharf was reserved for the use of officials. A kiosk in a alley on Beijing Road marks the location where Qing officials were greeted. In 1839, Lin Zexu used the wharf as a primary location for the destruction of British Opium. In addition, Sun Yat-sen took a ferry from this port during his escape to Hong Kong.

Yuexiu District
Guangzhou